is a railway station in the town of Kawanehon, Haibara District, Shizuoka Prefecture, Japan, operated by the Ōigawa Railway.

Lines

Station layout
The station has one side platform serving a single track, next to a small wooden station building. The station is unattended.

Adjacent stations

|-
!colspan=5|Ōigawa Railway

Station history
Shiogō Station was one of the original stations of the Ōigawa Main Line, and was opened on September 23, 1930.

Passenger statistics
In fiscal 2017, the station was used by an average of 6 passengers daily (boarding passengers only).

Surrounding area
Shiogō Dam

See also
 List of Railway Stations in Japan

References

External links

Ōigawa Railway home page

Stations of Ōigawa Railway
Railway stations in Shizuoka Prefecture
Railway stations in Japan opened in 1930
Kawanehon, Shizuoka